Esther Hope-Washington (born 9 July 1960) is a Trinidad and Tobago sprinter. She competed in the women's 4 × 100 metres relay at the 1984 Summer Olympics.

References

1960 births
Living people
Athletes (track and field) at the 1975 Pan American Games
Athletes (track and field) at the 1978 Commonwealth Games
Athletes (track and field) at the 1983 Pan American Games
Athletes (track and field) at the 1984 Summer Olympics
Trinidad and Tobago female sprinters
Olympic athletes of Trinidad and Tobago
Place of birth missing (living people)
Pan American Games medalists in athletics (track and field)
Pan American Games silver medalists for Trinidad and Tobago
Medalists at the 1983 Pan American Games
Central American and Caribbean Games medalists in athletics
Commonwealth Games competitors for Trinidad and Tobago